Tommy Dorsey: The Early Jazz Sides: 1932 – 1937 is a compilation album assembled by Jazz Legends mainly featuring Tommy Dorsey's works from the 1930s during his association with RCA Victor.

Track listing

Credits
Arranger: Paul Weston
Liner Notes: Scott Yanow
Tenor Sax: Bud Freeman
Trombone: Tommy Dorsey
Trumpeter: Bunny Berigan

References

Tommy Dorsey albums